Seneca Data is a private company categorized under computers, peripherals, and software. The company manufactures custom computers out of Syracuse, NY.

Operations
Seneca Data is a custom computer manufacturer and distributor of computer and information technologies. They engineer products for business, education, healthcare, digital signage, digital security and surveillance, and digital broadcast customers around the world. Seneca produces the Nexlink brand of custom-built desktops, notebooks, and servers, along with the Xvault brand of storage appliances; as well as media players for digital signage and video wall controllers for broadcast applications. Seneca manufactures custom computers out of Syracuse, NY and produces the Nexlink brand of computer technologies.

Executives
 Kevin Conley, CEO
 Jim Petrie, Senior VP, CFO
 Steve Maser, VP of Sales and Marketing
 Mike Smith, Vice President of Engineering Technology

Nexlink
Nexlink computer systems, manufactured by Seneca, covers a range of products including desktops, notebooks, computer server, and data storage. Nexlink is built using Intel motherboards and processors. Seneca Data is a Platinum Intel Technology Provider and all Nexlink products meet Windows Hardware Quality Labs (WHQL) approval.

Markets
 Healthcare
 Digital Signage
 SMB
 Government
 Education
 ISV
 OEM
 Commercial
 Retail

Products
 Nexlink 7100 Workstation

References

Companies based in Syracuse, New York
Electronics companies of the United States
Information technology companies of the United States
Computer companies of the United States